First Lady or First Gentlemen of the Republic of Georgia refers to the spouse or partner of the president of Georgia. The position is currently vacant under President Salome Zurabishvili, who has held the presidency since December 16, 2018. Zurabishvili husband, journalist Janri Kashia, died in 2012 before she became president.

First ladies and gentlemen of modern Georgia

References

Georgia